Eduarda Emilia Maino (2 October 1930 – 13 April 2004), known as Dadamaino, was an Italian visual artist and painter. She was a member of the Milanese avant-garde of the 1960s.

Biography
Eduarda Emilia Maino, nicknamed "Dada" for Eduarda, was born in Milan, Italy. Dadamaino first completed a medical degree before taking up art at the end of the 1950s. She frequented a group of young artists who followed Lucio Fontana and the spatialism movement. Members of the group included: Piero Manzoni, Gianni Colombo, Enrico Castellani and Agostino Bonalumi.

In 1958, Dadamaino produced a series of works called Volumi, which were exhibited in her first solo show at the Galleria dei Bossi in Milan the same year.

Shortly after, Dadamaino joined Azimuth, a group funded by Piero Manzoni, and the Germany-based Group Zero formed by Heinz Mack, Otto Piene and Günther Uecker.

The following years brought important experiments, among them the occupation with color grading and interferences between 1966 and 1968. Dadamaino intensively examined the effects of spectral colors to which she added black, white and brown in order to interrelate them. In 1967, at the peak of this development, she made her well known "ricerca del colore", an "exploration of the color". In squared plates Dadamaino analyzes the reciprocal effect of color and form, by grading each color in light and dark shades and contrasting it in lamellar stripes, she creates motion in the observer's eye. These were works of special aesthetic and  one of her most important period of creation.

Dadamaino counted Lucio Fontana and Yves Klein as major influences.

Exhibitions
Dadamaino had two solo shows at the Venice Biennale in 1980 and in 1990.

 1962 : Nul group exhibition, Stedelijk Museum, Amsterdam, Netherlands
 1983 : Retrospective, Padiglione d’Arte Contemporanea, Milan, Italy
 2000 : Retrospective, Bochum museum, Bochum, Germany
 2011 : "Volumes 1958-60", The Major Gallery, London, United Kingdom
 2013 : Dadamaino, Le Consortium, Dijon, France
 2013 : Dadamaino, Tornabuoni art, Paris, France

Collections 
Dadamaino’s works can be seen in collections such as: 

GAM, Turin
MART, Rovereto
 Museo del Novecento, Milan
 Museion, Bolzano
 Musée de Grenoble, Grenoble
 Centre Pompidou, Paris
 Hilti Art Foundation, Liechtenstein
 Tate Modern, London
 Philadelphia Museum of Art, Philadelphia
 Guggenheim, Venice
 Kunstmuseum Reutlingen / konkret, Reutlingen

References

1930 births
2004 deaths
20th-century Italian women artists
20th-century Italian painters
Italian contemporary artists
Italian women painters
Artists from Milan